Ernest-Argelès stadium is a French Rugby football stadium with a capacity of 4,000 seats located in Blagnac (in the close vicinity of Toulouse).

Description
Ernest-Argelès stadium is located on the sports complex of Ramier. It has the particularity of being close to the Garonne River on the opposite bank from the Ernest-Wallon Stadium of the Stade Toulousain.

Rugby Union clubs Blagnac SCR, in the third division, and Blagnac Saint-Orens RF, in the women's Premier division, play there their home games.

Toulouse Olympique have played Rugby League in the Championship since 2016 as the Stade des Minimes is not available.

References

Rugby league stadiums in France
Rugby union stadiums in France
Sports venues in Haute-Garonne
Toulouse Olympique